It's Been So Long may refer to:

Song
 "It's Been So Long", a 1953 single by Webb Pierce
 "It's Been So Long", B-side to "Sing, Sing, Sing (With a Swing), a 1936 song written Louis Prima
 "It's Been So Long", track on 1963 album This Is Ray Stevens
 "It's Been So Long", 1965 single by The Ikettes
 "It's Been So Long", track on 1967 album Pandemonium Shadow Show Harry Nilsson
 "It's Been So Long", track on 1972 album Nervous on the Road by Brinsley Schwarz
 "It's Been So Long", single and track on 1974 album Rock Your Baby by George McCrae
 "It's Been So Long", track on 1976 album Savage Eye by The Pretty Things
 "It's Been So Long", track on 1976 I'm Easy (album) by Keith Carradine
 "It's Been So Long", track on 1981 album Twangin... by Dave Edmunds
 "It's Been So Long", track on 1986 October File (album) by Die Kreuzen
 "It's Been So Long", track on 1986 album A Lot of Love by Melba Moore
 "It's Been So Long", 2005 single by Greg Johnson (musician)
 "It's Been So Long", track on 2005 Bring It On! (HorrorPops album)
 "It's Been So Long", track on 2006 album Micah P. Hinson and the Opera Circuit by Micah P. Hinson
 "It's Been So Long", track on 2008 I'll Be Around (album) by Split Lip Rayfield
 "It's Been So Long", track on 2008 EP Bang Band Sixxx by VAST
 "It's Been So Long" (featuring 8Ball), track on 2008 album This Might Be the Day by MJG
 "It's Been So Long", track on 2010 album Future Sons & Daughters by AM
 "It's Been So Long" (오랜만이죠) (feat. Shin Ji-soo), 2013 single by Ra.D
 "It's Been So Long", track on 2013 Join the Dots (Toy album)
 "It's Been So Long", track on several albums by Harry James
 "The Song is You"/"It's Been So Long", single by Trudy Richards with Pete Rugolo

Albums
 It's Been So Long, 1954 album by Helen Ward (singer)
 It's Been So Long, 1971 album by Spencer Davis
 It's Been So Long, 1987 album by Downchild Blues Band reissued in 1997

See also
It's Been So Long Darling, a 1945 song by Ernest Tubb